Rose Marasco (born December 25, 1948), is an American photographer. She is considered to be "perhaps Maine’s most prolific photographer,” living and working there since 1979.

Early life and education
Rose Marasco grew up in Utica, New York. She earned her Bachelor of Fine Arts in photography at Syracuse University in 1971, an M.A. from Goddard College in 1981, and her Master of Fine Arts at the Visual Studies Workshop in Rochester. where she studied under Nathan Lyons and Joan Lyons.

Teaching career
After leaving VSW, Marasco "initiated the photography program at Munson Williams Proctor Arts Institute in Utica, NY,  establishing  the curriculum, darkrooms, & studios, and teaching both black & white and color" from 1974 to 1979. Marasco moved to Maine in 1979 for a position at the University of Southern Maine, where she taught photography for 35 years, retiring as Distinguished Professor Emeritus in 2014.

Artistic career
Marasco has been an exhibited artist since 1971 with twenty-three solo shows and more than sixty group shows. Marasco’s photographs are included in public collections of distinction including at: The Fogg Museum at Harvard University; The Davis Museum and Cultural Center at Wellesley College; The New York Public Library Photography Collection; The Portland Museum of Art; and The Bowdoin College Museum of Art among others. She has lectured about her work at Harvard University, Parsons School of Design, the Center for Photography at Woodstock, Bowdoin College, Maine College of Art, and many other institutions in the United States.

In 2015 The Portland Museum of Art mounted a major retrospective, called index, of Marasco's work, organized by PMA Chief Curator Jessica May. Describing her method in a review of the exhibition, critic John Yau wrote “It seems to me that Marasco deserves both a full-sized monograph and to be better known. She is more than Maine’s most prolific photographer.” In 2016 Marasco was awarded the Maine Women's Fund Sarah Orne Jewett Award, given to "a Maine woman who exhibits the attributes of the women in Jewett’s works of fiction: true grit, independence, courage, humor and discipline," and in 2005, received the Excellence in Photographic Teaching Award from Santa Fe Center for Photography New Mexico.

Selected solo exhibitions
2018 "Rose Marasco: index" Munson-Williams-Proctor Institute School of Art
2015 “Rose Marasco: index” Portland Museum of Art
2015 “Patrons of Husbandry" Ogunquit Museum of American Art, Ogunquit, Maine
2014 "New York City Pinhole Photographs" Meredith Ward Fine Art, New York
2010 "Projections" Houston Center for Photography
2008 "The Invented Photograph" Universite de Bretagne Occidentale, Brest, France
2004 "Domestic Objects: Past and Presence" University of Southern Maine
2003 "Circles" Sarah Morthland Gallery, New York
2002 "Open House: Margaret Jane Mussey Sweat”, Portland Museum of Art
2000 “Leafing” Sarah Morthland Gallery, New York
1999 "Ritual and Community: The Maine Grange" College of the Atlantic, Bar Harbor, Maine
1998 “New England Diary” Sarah Morthland Gallery, New York
1996 "Ritual and Community: The Maine Grange" Latvian Museum of Photography, Riga, Latvia
1995 "Tender Buttons: Women’s Domestic Objects" Davis Museum at Wellesley College, Wellesley, Massachusetts
1992 "Ritual and Community: The Maine Grange" Farnsworth Art Museum, Rockland, Maine
1982 “Rose Marasco: Photomontage” Portland School of Art
1980 “Rose Marasco: Photographs” Goddard College, Plainfield, Vermont

Public collections
Bates College Museum of Art, Lewiston, Maine
Bowdoin College Museum of Art
Davis Museum and Cultural Center at Wellesley College
Farnsworth Art Museum, Rockland, Maine
Fidelity Investments Corporate Art Collection
Fogg Museum at Harvard University
The Maine Historic Preservation Commission], Augusta, Maine
Maine Women Writers Collection, University of New England, Portland, Maine
National Museum of American History
New York Public Library Miriam and Ira D. Wallach Division of Art, Prints and Photographs
Photographic Resource Center, Artists’ Book Archive, Boston, Massachusetts
Polaroid International Collection, Cambridge, Massachusetts
Portland Museum of Art
Rhode Island School of Design Museum of Art, Providence, Rhode Island
Syracuse University, Newhouse Communications Center, Syracuse, New York
University of New England Art Gallery, Portland, Maine
University of Maine Museum of Art, Bangor, Maine
Visual Studies Workshop, Rochester, New York

Teaching
2016–present Artist Mentor, MFA Studio, New Hampshire Institute of Art, Manchester, New Hampshire
2014 Distinguished Professor Emerita, Department of Art, University of Southern Maine
2010–2014 Distinguished Professor, Department of Art, University of Southern Maine
2000–2010 Professor, Department of Art, University of Southern Maine
2007–present Artist Mentor, MFA Studio, The Art Institute of Boston at Lesley University, Massachusetts
1981–1987 Instructor, Portland School of Art (now Maine College of Art)
1981 Visiting professor, Colby College, Waterville, Maine
1974–1979 Instructor & Founding Head of Photography, Munson-Williams-Proctor Arts Institute, Utica, NY

Books

Covers

“Camouflage” by Murray Bail (2001) Farrar, Straus and Giroux

“Latest Will: New & Selected Poems” by Lenore Marshall (2002) W.W. Norton & Company

“Confessions” by Kang Zhengguo (2007) W.W. Norton & Company

“Mouth Wide Open” by John Thorne (2007) North Point Press

Work included in

“Thoughts on Landscape: Collected Writings and Interviews” by Frank Gohlke (2009) Hol Art Books

“Portland Through the Lens” (2007) warren machine company

“Undomesticated Interiors” (2003) essays by April Gallant and Mimi Hellman, Smith College Museum of Art

“Designing Identity” (2000) Marc English Rockport Publishers

“The Lure of the Local: Senses of Place in a Multicentered Society” by Lucy R. Lippard (1997) The New Press

“Ritual and Community: The Maine Grange” essay by Frank Gohlke Amazon Books

“Selections 4: Polaroid International Exhibition” (1988) essay by Mark Haworth-Booth

Select Critical Reviews
Julien Langevin, "Plastic Expressions in Particularity: Nature Moves in Tracy McKenna’s Shift at Able Baker Contemporary." ArtSpiel, November 21, 2019.

John Yau, “Photographs That Write With Light.” Hyperallergic, November 16, 2019.

Daniel Kany, “Both smoke AND mirrors: Photography of Rose Marasco.” Portland Press Herald, May 31, 2015.

Mark Feeney, “In Portland, a survey of Rose Marasco’s photographs." Boston Globe, May 28, 2015.

Bob Keyes, “In a summer of art, a Rose blooms.” Portland Press Herald, May 25, 2015.

External link
Photographer’s website

References

1948 births
Living people
American women photographers
University of Southern Maine faculty
People from Utica, New York
Syracuse University alumni
Artists from Maine
Photographers from Maine
Photographers from New York (state)
Visual Studies Workshop alumni
American women academics
21st-century American women